Lamaika is a monotypic genus of South African araneomorph spiders in the family Phyxelididae containing the single species, Lamaika distincta. It was first described by C. E. Griswold in 1990, and is only found in South Africa.

See also
 List of Phyxelididae species

References

Endemic fauna of South Africa
Monotypic Araneomorphae genera
Phyxelididae
Spiders of South Africa